"Nasty" is a song by American rapper Bandit Gang Marco featuring fellow American rapper Young Dro. The song was released as the lead single from Marco's debut studio album, Nasty the Album.

Release
The single was released on February 10, 2014. It was also sold on iTunes as part of Marco's debut studio album, Nasty The Album. The single was also uploaded to SoundCloud via a user named Future Trap.

Music video
The music video for the song was released on YouTube on November 28, 2014, and has received over 3 million views.

Remixes
The official remix features American rappers Kevin Gates and Young Thug.

The best known remix of this song is "Nasty Freestyle" by rapper T-Wayne, which had a much better commercial performance than the original, selling over a million copies.. The remix was a commercial success in the United States, peaking at number 9 on the Billboard Hot 100.

Commercial performance
The song peaked at number 41 on the Billboard Hot 100. It also charted at #68 in Canada, making it Dro's first international single.

Charts

References

External links
 Official music video on YouTube
 Full lyrics of this song on Genius
 "Nasty" on SoundCloud

2014 debut singles
2014 songs
Hip hop songs
Songs written by 30 Roc